Kang Seong-jin (born 26 March 2003) is a South Korean footballer currently playing as a forward for FC Seoul and the South Korea national team.

Club career
Kang Seong-jin joined FC Seoul in 2021.

On 10 March 2020, Jung debuted in K League 1.

On September 26, he started as a right winger in the Super Match away against Suwon Samsung Bluewings in the 32nd round of the league. In a corner kick situation, after receiving a short connected ball and raising a cross, Cho Young-wook scored the goal and helped record his first offensive point in his professional debut. After that, he showed active movement throughout the game until he was replaced by Dong-won Ji in the 68th minute. In the 33R Daegu FC match, he started as a right winger and did not play much, and was substituted out with Dong-Won Ji.

In the 35th round Gwangju FC away, in the 78th minute, after shaking the Gwangju defense with a dribble from the right flank, a powerful left-footed shot hit the near post passed goalkeeper Yoon Bo-sang and equalized the goal. It was his first professional goal and became the first semi-professional player to score. He is also the youngest scorer in the K-League history since 2013, when the promotion system was introduced. Seoul also succeeded in winning the so-called 'Seoul overturning the three-goal gap' in the match, adding to the festive atmosphere.

International career 
He was part of the South Korea squad at the 2022 EAFF E-1 Football Championship.

Career statistics

Club

International goals
Scores and results list Japan's goal tally first.

References

External links
 
 

2003 births
Living people
South Korean footballers
South Korea youth international footballers
Association football forwards
K League 1 players
FC Seoul players